Jiří Hozak (born December 10, 1996) is a Czech professional ice hockey player. He is currently playing for HC Sparta Praha of the Czech Extraliga.

Hozak made his Czech Extraliga debut playing with HC Sparta Praha during the 2015-16 Czech Extraliga season.

References

External links

1996 births
Living people
HC Sparta Praha players
Czech ice hockey forwards
Ice hockey people from Prague
LHK Jestřábi Prostějov players
Czech expatriate ice hockey players in the United States